Robert Moore (February 1, 1927 – May 10, 1984) was an American stage, film and television director and actor.

Biography
Born in Detroit, Michigan, Moore studied at the Catholic University of America Drama Department under Gilbert V. Hartke. He is best known for his direction of the ground-breaking play The Boys in the Band, his Broadway productions (which garnered him five Tony Award nominations), and his collaborations - three plays and three films - with Neil Simon, including the detective spoofs Murder By Death and The Cheap Detective.

As an actor, he played a disabled gay man opposite Liza Minnelli in the 1970 drama Tell Me That You Love Me, Junie Moon, appeared in two episodes of Valerie Harper's sitcom Rhoda (for which he also directed 26 episodes), in one episode of The Mary Tyler Moore Show (as Phyllis' gay brother) and was a regular on Diana Rigg's short-lived 1973 sitcom Diana. His other television directing credits include The Bob Newhart Show and the 1976 production of Cat on a Hot Tin Roof with Natalie Wood, Robert Wagner, Laurence Olivier, and Maureen Stapleton.

Moore died of AIDS-related pneumonia in New York City on May 10, 1984.

Work
Theatre

Promises, Promises (1968)
The Last of the Red Hot Lovers (1969)
The Gingerbread Lady (1970)
Lorelei (1974)
My Fat Friend (1974)
Deathtrap (1978)
They're Playing Our Song (1979)
Woman of the Year (1981)

Filmography
Film
Murder by Death (1976)
The Cheap Detective (1978)
Chapter Two (1979)

Television
 Diana (1973) – TV series
Thursday's Game (1974) – TV movie
 The Bob Newhart Show (1974) – TV series
 Rhoda (1974–1975) – TV series
 Don't Call Us (1976) – TV movie
 Cat on a Hot Tin Roof (1976) – TV movie
 There's Always Room (1977) – TV movie
 The Sunshine Boys (1977) – TV movie
 The Natural Look (1977) – TV movie
 Annie Flynn (1978) – TV movie
 It's Not Easy (1983) – TV series

Actor
 Tell Me That You Love Me, Junie Moon (1970) – Warren
 The Mary Tyler Moore Show (1973) – Ben Sutherland (1 episode)
 Diana (1973) – Marshall Tyler (7 episodes)
 Rhoda  (1974–1976) – Lowell Snyder; Mr. Graham (2 episodes)

Awards and nominations
Awards
 1968 Drama Desk Award for Outstanding Direction of a Play – The Boys in the Band
Nominations
 1969 Tony Award for Best Direction of a Musical – Promises, Promises
 1970 Tony Award for Best Direction of a Play – Last of the Red Hot Lovers
 1978 Tony Award for Best Direction of a Play – Deathtrap
 1979 Tony Award for Best Direction of a Musical – They're Playing Our Song
 1981 Tony Award for Best Direction of a Musical – Woman of the Year

References

External links
 
 
 

1927 births
1984 deaths
American film directors
LGBT film directors
LGBT television directors
LGBT theatre directors
American television directors
American theatre directors
AIDS-related deaths in New York (state)
American gay actors
20th-century LGBT people